The 2011 NCAA Division I baseball tournament began on Friday, June 3, 2011 as part of the 2011 NCAA Division I baseball season.  The 64 team double elimination tournament concluded with the 2011 College World Series in Omaha, Nebraska, on June 29, 2011.

The 64 NCAA Division I college baseball teams were selected out of an eligible 300 teams. Thirty teams were awarded an automatic bid as champions of their conferences, and 34 teams were selected at-large by the NCAA Division I Baseball Committee.

Bids

Automatic bids 

Conference champions from 30 Division I conferences earned automatic bids to regionals.  The remaining 34 spots were awarded to schools as at-large invitees.

By conference

National seeds
Bold indicates CWS participant.

 Virginia
 Florida
 North Carolina
 South Carolina
 
 Vanderbilt
 Texas

Regionals & Super Regionals
Bold indicates winner. * indicates extra innings.

Charlottesville Super Regional

Santa Clara Super Regional

Hosted by the University of California at Stephen Schott Stadium on the campus of Santa Clara University.**

**California hosted the super regional at Santa Clara because its own stadium (Evans Diamond) could not accommodate television crews and did not have lights.

Tallahassee Super Regional

Columbia Super Regional

Gainesville Super Regional

Austin Super Regional

Nashville Super Regional

Chapel Hill Super Regional

College World Series

Participants

Bracket

Championship Series

Game 1

Game 2

All-Tournament Team

The following players were members of the College World Series All-Tournament Team.

Final standings
Seeds listed below indicate national seeds only

 # denotes national seed

Record by conference

The columns RF, SR, WS, NS, CS, and NC respectively stand for the Regional Finals, Super Regionals, College World Series, National Semifinals, Championship Series, and National Champion.

Tournament Notes

Round 1

14 of 16 No. 1 seeds won their first round games, with Georgia Tech & UCLA being the only No. 1 seeds to lose.
Only 5 of 16 No. 2 seeds won their first round games.

Round 2

6 No. 1 seeds have been eliminated from the tournament. 3 prior to the regional finals: TCU, Cal State Fullerton, and No. 8 national seed Rice; with Georgia Tech, Clemson, and UCLA losing in the regional final

Regional Finals

6 non No. 1 seeds have won their regional and advanced to the Super Regionals: No. 3 UC Irvine, No. 3 Mississippi State, No. 3 Dallas Baptist, No. 3 California, No. 2 Stanford, and No. 2 Connecticut

Super Regionals
In the context of almost being eliminated as a sponsored intercollegiate team by the University due to financial issues, the Cal Baseball team has advanced to the College World Series as a No. 3 seed.

College World Series
Before the opening game of the CWS between Vanderbilt and North Carolina, the ceremonial first pitch was delivered by former President George W. Bush. Omaha Little Leaguer Henry Slagle had the honor of handing the ball to President Bush as his Memorial Park Little League team greeted the former president on the field. Before the pitch, his father, former President George H. W. Bush, who played for Yale in the first CWS in 1947, delivered a video message christening the new facility.
 This is the first CWS to feature eight schools from BCS automatic qualifying conferences. (3 SEC, 2 ACC, 2 Big 12, 1 Pac-10)
The 1987 event was the last with eight major football-playing schools. Florida State, which played baseball in the Metro Conference at the time, was an elite Independent in football, since the Metro did not sponsor football until the 1995 conference reunification.
 The SEC Eastern Division has three teams in the same CWS for the first time, South Carolina, Florida, Vanderbilt.
The SEC East qualified all three teams in these semi-finals, effectively taking the podium.
The SEC West qualified four of its six teams in 1997, including national champion LSU.
 Florida is making its first back-to-back trip to the College World Series in school history. South Carolina is also making a back-to-back CWS appearance, but for the fourth time, (1981–82, 2002, 03, 04 & 2010-11).
 South Carolina is the first defending Champion to make it back to the CWS and defend its title since Oregon State did so in 2007.
 This is Vanderbilt's first trip to the College World Series in school history.
 This now makes Kentucky the only SEC school to have never made it to the College World Series.
 Both members added to the SEC in 2013, Texas A&M (which was in this tournament) and Missouri (six appearances, last in 1964), also previously made it to Omaha.
 This is the 19th consecutive year that the SEC has fielded at least one team in the College World Series.
 This is the 4th consecutive year that the SEC has fielded at least one team in the Championship Series.
 * This is the second time that the SEC fielded two teams in the Championship Game, and with the last in 1997, LSU-Alabama 1997, representing the Western Division, this was the first to feature two Eastern Division opponents.
 The SEC was undefeated against out-of-conference opponents this CWS, going 6–0 in those games versus teams outside of the SEC.
 The Big 12 Conference went 0–4 this CWS.
 There have been 86 extra-inning games played in the history of the College World Series. By the end of this series, South Carolina had played in the past four.
 Three CWS Championship Series games have gone to 11 innings. By the end of this series South Carolina had played in the past two.
 For the first time in CWS history, the All-Tournament Team, including the Most Outstanding Player, was composed entirely of players from one conference, the SEC; more specifically the SEC Eastern Division. (South Carolina x 7, Florida x 2, Vanderbilt x 2).
 The South Carolina Gamecocks were the first team to go undefeated in the NCAA tournament since the Miami Hurricanes did so in 2001.
 With Game 2 Championship Series win South Carolina ties NCAA record for consecutive Post Season wins (Texas 1983-84) 15.
 With Game 2 Championship Series win South Carolina ties NCAA record for consecutive College World Series wins (Southern California, LSU) 10.
 South Carolina becomes the first team to win the CWS NCAA National Championship in the new TD Ameritrade Park Omaha. (South Carolina was also the last team to win the Championship in the old Johnny Rosenblatt Stadium.)
 South Carolina becomes the first team to win the CWS NCAA National Championship while using the new BBCOR (Batted Ball Coefficient of Restitution) Standard composite baseball bats that resulted in far less overall offensive production, nationally and across the board, during the 2011 college baseball season. The Gamecocks were also the first team to win the CWS while operating under the new "20-second pitch clock" rule. (South Carolina was also the last team to win the CWS in 2010 using the old metal bats and without a time limit imposed between pitches.)
 South Carolina becomes the sixth team in CWS history to win Back-to-Back NCAA D1 Baseball Championships. (Texas 1949-50, Southern California 1970-74, Stanford 1987-88, LSU 1996-97, Oregon State 2006-07. South Carolina 2010-11)
 This was the lowest-scoring College World Series in modern, (aluminum bat usage), history.

Television coverage

Selection shows
The NCAA Division I Road to Omaha Selection Show Presented by Capital One aired on ESPN on May 30, 2011.

Competition
Regionals:
The Fullerton and Gainesville Regionals were broadcast on ESPNU and ESPN3.com
The Corvallis and Fort Worth Regionals were broadcast on ESPN3.com
The Atlanta Regional was broadcast on CSS
The Tallahassee Regional was broadcast on Sun Sports and Fox Sports Florida
Super Regionals: All games were broadcast on either ESPN, ESPN2, ESPNU, ESPN3.com, and ESPN Mobile
CWS: Every game was broadcast on either ESPN or ESPN2.

References 

NCAA Division I Baseball Championship
Tournament
Baseball in Austin, Texas
Baseball in the Dallas–Fort Worth metroplex
Baseball in Houston